Chhavviram Singh Yadav was a dacoit  from Uttar Pradesh. One of his most trusted fellows was Udaiveer Singh from the village Nasirpur, Ghiror, UP.

Early life 
Chhavviram Singh was a resident of Auchha village in Mainpuri district of Uttar Pradesh. At the age of twenty, he became a dacoit. Gradually his terror increased. He had spread panic in Uttar Pradesh, Madhya Pradesh and Rajasthan by dacoity and murder. People trembled with fear of him. Even the police did not dare to confront him. Around 1978, Chhaviram had become another name for the terrorist. His gang was accused of killing an MLA and burying the dead body in the ground. He projected himself as the messiah of the Yadava people. VP Singh became the Chief Minister of Uttar Pradesh in June 1980. At that time, dacoits were dominant in Uttar Pradesh. Phulan Devi had killed 20 people in 1981. Meanwhile, Chiviram's terror was also increasing. Then VP Singh had launched a big campaign of eradication of bandits in Uttar Pradesh. The government announced a reward of one lakh rupees for the capture of Chhaviram. But the police could not catch him. Dacoit Chhavi Ram had become synonymous with terror in the entire state. District Eta was considered as the place of refuge of Dasyu Chaviram. Police forces were setting up camps in Aliganj area. 7 August 1981 became the day of call for Uttar Pradesh Police. The then Police Station in-charge of Aliganj, Rajpal Singh was eagerly waiting for this day. On the information of the informer, Inspector Rajpal Singh reached Nathuapur village along with his companions. Where 60-70 crooks were gathered. But Inspector Rajpal was not scared and got crowded with him. In this encounter that lasted for hours, the bullets fell short with the police. Due to which the dacoit Chhaviram brutally killed nine policemen including Inspector Rajpal Singh by laying siege from all sides. Three villagers also died in this. in early 1982, Chhaviram kidnapped the circle officer of Aliganj tehsil of Etah district. He suspected that the administration was torturing his supporters to get his clue. Chhaviram had challenged the government in a way by kidnapping the Circle Officer of Police. Indira Gandhi was the Prime Minister at that time. The incident brought a blow to the image of the government. Indira Gandhi is said to have given tacit consent to VP Singh to kill Chhaviram. At the behest of Indira Gandhi, the governments of Uttar Pradesh, Madhya Pradesh and Rajasthan issued warrants. Considering this incident of 1981 as a challenge, the then Chief Minister VP Singh made a plan to eliminate the dacoit Chhaviram and after two years, the Uttar Pradesh Police made the state fear-free by encountering the dacoit Chhaviram. During this, SSP Vikram Singh took over in Etah, Uttar Pradesh. Who later became the Director General of Police of Uttar Pradesh Police in 2007.

Family after encounter 
After Encounter of dacoit Chavviram in 1982, his wife Dhan Devi got her children educated in her maternal home village, Nagla District Kannauj they have three sons – Shyam Singh, Sarvesh Kumar Yadav and Ajay Pal Singh Yadav. Two elder sons are farmers, younger son Ajay Pal Singh Yadav is Sub-Inspector in Uttar Pradesh Police.

References 

https://www.indiatoday.in/magazine/crime/story/19820331-uttar-pradesh-most-wanted-dacoit-chhabiram-killed-after-seven-and-a-half-hour-battle-771625-2013-10-18

Criminals from Uttar Pradesh
1982 deaths
Year of birth missing